The following is a complete episode list  of 1990s and 2000s undercover cop television series Nash Bridges. In the United States  the show aired on CBS from 1996 to 2001. There are a total of 122 episodes. Nash Bridges starred Don Johnson and Cheech Marin.

Series overview

Episodes

Season 1 (1996)

Season 2 (1996–97)

Season 3 (1997–98)

Season 4 (1998–99)

Season 5 (1999–2000)

Season 6 (2000–01)

References

External links 
 
 

Lists of American crime drama television series episodes